White Mountain is a locality in the Lockyer Valley Region, Queensland, Australia.

Geography 
The terrain is mountainous with White Mountain being the highest peak at 527 metres. As a consequence the locality is mostly undeveloped. The south-eastern part of the locality forms part of the Lockyer National Park.

History 
The locality was named and bounded on 18 February 2000. It presumably takes its name from the mountain.

References 

Lockyer Valley Region
Localities in Queensland